The Sixth Sense is an album by jazz trumpeter Lee Morgan, released on the Blue Note label in 1970. The album features performances by Morgan, Jackie McLean, Frank Mitchell, Cedar Walton, Victor Sproles and Billy Higgins. The CD reissue added three tracks featuring Harold Mabern and Mickey Bass.

Reception
The AllMusic review by Michael G. Nastos stated: "The appropriately title Sixth Sense presents a transition between one of the most intriguing sextets during the last years of post-bop and Morgan's final ensembles that saw him reaching higher and higher before, like Icarus, falling from grace.".

Track listing 
All compositions by Lee Morgan, except where indicated.
 "The Sixth Sense" - 6:45
 "Short Count" - 6:02
 "Psychedelic" - 6:32
 "Afreaka" (Walton) - 8:03
 "Anti Climax" - 6:19
 "The Cry of My People" (Cal Massey) - 5:23

Bonus tracks on CD reissue:
"Extemporaneous" (Mitchell) - 5:08
 "Mickey's Tune" (Bass) - 6:35
 "Leebop" - 5:38

Recorded on November 10, 1967 (tracks 1-6) and September 13, 1968 (tracks 7-9).

Personnel 
 Lee Morgan - trumpet
 Jackie McLean - alto saxophone (tracks 1 to 5)
 Frank Mitchell - tenor saxophone
 Cedar Walton - piano (1 to 6)
 Victor Sproles - bass (1 to 6)
 Billy Higgins - drums
 Harold Mabern - piano (7 to 9)
 Mickey Bass - bass  (7 to 9)

References 

Hard bop albums
Lee Morgan albums
1970 albums
Blue Note Records albums
Albums produced by Francis Wolff
Albums produced by Duke Pearson
Albums recorded at Van Gelder Studio